The 34th (Pomeranian) Fusiliers "Queen Victoria of Sweden" was a regiment of the Imperial German Army through the First World War.

The regiment had its origins in the Swedish Queen's Life Guards on Foot and fought in several Swedish wars of the time. After the end of the Napoleonic Wars and the transferral of Pomerania from Sweden to Prussia the regiment got its new name; 34th (Pomeranian) Fusiliers (German: Füsilier-Regiment (Pommersches) Nr. 34).

In fall 1908, the new royal couple, Gustaf V and Victoria of Baden got a state visit by the new queen's cousin Kaiser Wilhelm II of Germany. They exchanged honours, with Kaiser Wilhelm II becoming a Knight of the Order of Vasa, and Gustaf V becoming the honourary Chief of the 3rd (Queen Elizabeth) Guards Grenadiers and his wife Victoria the Chief of the 34th (Pomeranian) Fusiliers, whom got its new name 34th (Pomeranian) Fusiliers "Queen Victoria of Sweden".
The banner of the regiment became a trophy of the Russian army (https://btgv.ru/uniform/german-banners-trophies-of-the-russian-army-of-the-great-war/).

Gallery

See also 

 List of Imperial German infantry regiments
 List of Imperial German cavalry regiments
 List of Imperial German artillery regiments

References 

Infantry regiments of the Prussian Army
Fusilier regiments